20th Century Ghosts is American author Joe Hill's first published book-length work. A collection of short stories, it was first published in October 2005 in the United Kingdom and released in October 2007 in the United States.

Publication history
20th Century Ghosts is the first publication made by American author Joe Hill in October 2005 by PS Publishing which is based in the United Kingdom. The original release was available for pre-sale only through the publisher's website.

The collection has won several awards including the Bram Stoker Award for Best Fiction Collection, as well as the British Fantasy Award for Best Collection and Best Short Story for "Best New Horror." The hardcover editions are collectable, especially the signed slipcased edition that had a print run of 200 copies.

In October 2007, HarperCollins Publishers released the first public edition of Hill's collection. This edition also contains the short story "Bobby Conroy Comes Back from the Dead," which was not previously published in the UK edition. Also in October, Apple Inc.'s United States iTunes Store released audiobook versions of the stories in this edition, at US$0.95 per short story, through 29 October.

Limited editions
Released in October 2005, this short story collection was released in a limited edition format only. The three formats available before publication were:
 Deluxe slipcased signed limited hardcover edition signed by Hill and Christopher Golden (introduction author) and numbered 1-200
 Signed limited edition hardcover signed by Hill and numbered 1-500
 Trade paperback unsigned at 1,000 copies printed

Contents

Best New Horror
Eddie Carroll is the editor of an annual anthology entitled America's Best New Horror. As part of his job he has read and rejected many thousands of derivative stories, and he has become jaded by the process. When he reads the strangely disturbing story "Buttonboy" by Peter Kilrue, he regains his passion for his work. The plot concerns his search for the elusive Kilrue in an attempt to procure "Buttonboy" for the anthology.

20th Century Ghost
The Rosebud Theatre is an old style movie palace, haunted by the semi-legendary spirit of a young woman. The girl died during a screening of The Wizard of Oz, appears infrequently throughout the twentieth century, and occasionally starts conversations with a select few moviegoers. The story is told by Alec Sheldon, the theatre owner, who worries about his approaching mortality and what will happen to the Rosebud after he retires.

Pop Art
This story was originally published in 2001 in an anthology titled With Signs & Wonders by Invisible Cities Press. In 2007, Subterranean Press produced a limited edition chapbook of "Pop Art" limited to 150 numbered copies and 52 lettered copies. These books were only available through the publishers website.

The plot concerns the friendship of two socially outcast boys: the narrator, who has a dysfunctional home life, and his only friend, a human boy made of inflatable plastic who has loving and supportive flesh-and-blood parents. Christopher Golden called it one of the best short stories in years.

You Will Hear The Locust Sing
The story of a boy who wakes up one morning to find that he has become a giant, human-sized insect.

Abraham's Boys
Abraham Van Helsing, living in America following the events of Dracula, tries to teach his sons about vampires.

Better Than Home
Story about a troubled boy whose father manages a baseball team.

The Black Phone
Thirteen-year-old Finney is kidnapped by a man named The Grabber. Trapped in a basement room, the boy's only hope may lie in a mysterious disconnected black phone hanging on the basement wall. The phone rings at night with the whispers of the kidnapper's previous (and now dead) victims. In 2021, this short story was adapted into a film of the same title, with Ethan Hawke as The Grabber.

In The Rundown
A video store clerk comes upon a grisly scene on a weedy dirt lane.

The Cape
Seven-year-old Eric learns that he can fly (well, sort of) while wearing his blue cape. After suffering a terrible injury he thinks the cape is lost, only to find the cape again years later.

Last Breath
The story concerns Dr. Allinger, an old man who runs a "Museum of Silence" which contains the last breaths of various people, some being famous figures such as Edgar Allan Poe.

The Widow's Breakfast
During the Great Depression, a drifter encounters a widow whose offer of food and fresh clothing may be too good to be true.

Bobby Conroy Comes Back From The Dead 
A failed comedian meets his now-married ex-girlfriend during the filming of Dawn of the Dead.

My Father's Mask
Thirteen-year-old Jack's parents take him on an unexpected trip to their cabin on Big Cat Lake. Along the way they play a game made up by Jack's mother in which they are being chased by the "playing card people". At the cabin Jack finds various masks, which he is told must be worn to disguise themselves from the playing card people. Jack grows weary of the game, but soon he finds that it may not be a game at all.

Adaptations 

 Pop Art (2008), short film directed by Amanda Boyle, based on short story "Pop Art"
 Abraham's Boys (2009), short film directed by Dorothy Street, based on short story "Abraham's Boys"
 The Black Phone (2021), film directed by Scott Derrickson, based on short story The Black Phone

References

External links
 Joe Hill's official web site
 PS Publishing official web site — Original U.K. publisher of 20th Century Ghosts
Archived entry for 20th Century Ghosts
 William Morrow official web site — U.S. published of 20th Century Ghosts
Entry for 20th Century Ghosts 
 

2005 short story collections
Debut books
Ghost stories
Horror short story collections
Works by Joe Hill (writer)